Olaxon A Tamba (born 10 June 2003) is a Thai professional footballer who plays as a forward for Metalac, on loan from Chiangmai United.

Club career
A Tamba was born to Steven A Tamba, a former Liberian footballer, and a mother from Lopburi province. He started playing football at the Patumkongka School and Suankularb Wittayalai School, before joining Sukhothai in 2020.

After a short spell with Sukhothai, he joined Chiangmai United, who loaned him to Thai League 3 side Chiangrai City in 2022. On his return, he was again loaned out, this time to Serbian side Metalac. He made his debut for Metalac in October 2022.

International career
A Tamba has represented Thailand at under-16, under-19 and under-23 level.

Career statistics

Club

Notes

References

2003 births
Living people
Olaxon A Tamba
Olaxon A Tamba
Olaxon A Tamba
Association football forwards
Olaxon A Tamba
Serbian First League players
Olaxon A Tamba
Olaxon A Tamba
FK Metalac Gornji Milanovac players
Thai expatriate footballers
Expatriate footballers in Serbia